The 1901 Princeton Tigers football team represented Princeton University in the 1901 college football season. The team finished with a 9–1–1 record under first-year head coach Langdon Lea.  The Tigers won their first nine games, including eight shutouts, and outscored their opponents by a total of 247 to 24.  The team's only loss was in the last game of the season by a 12–0 score against Yale. Princeton end Ralph Tipton Davis was selected as a consensus first-team honoree on the 1901 College Football All-America Team.

Schedule

References

Princeton
Princeton Tigers football seasons
Princeton Tigers football